180th Street may refer to:

180th Street (IRT Third Avenue Line)
180th Street – Bronx Park (IRT White Plains Road Line)
East 180th Street (IRT White Plains Road Line)